The Pullen Strait is a natural waterway through the central Canadian Arctic Archipelago in the territory of Nunavut. It separates Little Cornwallis Island (to the north-west) from Cornwallis Island (to the south-east), and is named after William Pullen.

Straits of Qikiqtaaluk Region